The Arapaho (Arapahoe) language is one of the Plains Algonquian languages, closely related to Gros Ventre and other Arapahoan languages. It is spoken by the Arapaho of Wyoming and Oklahoma. Speakers of Arapaho primarily live on the Wind River Indian Reservation in Wyoming, though some have affiliation with the Cheyenne living in western Oklahoma.

Classification
Arapaho is an Algonquian language of the Algic family.

History 
By the 1850s, Arapaho bands formed two tribes: the Northern Arapaho and Southern Arapaho. Since 1878 the Northern Arapaho have lived with the Eastern Shoshone on the Wind River Reservation in Wyoming and are federally recognized as the Arapahoe Tribe of the Wind River Reservation. The Southern Arapaho live with the Southern Cheyenne in Oklahoma. Together their members are enrolled as the federally recognized Cheyenne and Arapaho Tribes.

After World War II, the Northern Arapaho tribe tended to use English, not Arapaho, when raising their children. However, Arapaho speakers within the tribe still primarily speak Arapaho amongst each other. The Northern Arapaho additionally have had relatively less intermingling with other tribes and non-Native Americans compared to the Southern Arapaho who live amongst a predominantly non-Native American population.

Current status 
The exact number of Arapaho speakers is not precisely known; however it has been estimated that the language currently retains between 250  and 1,000 active users. Arapaho has limited development outside of the home; however, it is used in some films and the Bible was translated into the language in 1903. According to one source, under 300 people over the age of 50 speak the language in Wyoming, and in Oklahoma the language is used by "only a handful of people . . . all near eighty or older". As of 1996, there were approximately 1,000 speakers among the Northern Arapaho. As of 2008, the authors of a newly published grammar estimated that there were slightly over 250 fluent speakers, plus "quite a few near-fluent passive understanders". In 2008, it was reported that a school had been opened to teach the language to children. Arapaho language camps were held in Summer 2015 at Wind River Tribal College and in St. Stephens, Wyoming. Currently, the language may be acquired by children, for a population estimate as recent as 2007 lists an increase to 1,000 speakers and notes that the language is in use in schools, bilingual education efforts begun on Wind River Reservation in the 1980s and the Arapaho Language Lodge, a successful immersion program, was established in 1993. "The Arapaho Project" is an effort made by the Arapaho people to promote and restore their traditional language and culture. Despite hope for the language, its relatively few active users and the fact that it has seen recent population decreases render Arapaho an endangered language. Ethnologue deems it "moribund".

Dialects
Besawunena, only attested from a wordlist collected by Kroeber, differs only slightly from Arapaho, though a few of its sound changes resemble those seen in Gros Ventre. It had speakers among the Northern Arapaho as recently as the late 1920s.

Phonology
These and other changes serve to give Arapaho a phonological system very divergent from that of Proto-Algonquian and other Algonquian languages, and even from languages spoken in the adjacent Great Basin. Some examples comparing Arapaho words with their cognates in Proto-Algonquian can illustrate this:

Vowels
At the level of pronunciation, Arapaho words cannot begin with a vowel, so where the underlying form of a word begins with a vowel, a prothetic  is added.

Arapaho has a series of four short vowels  (pronounced ) and four long vowels  (customarily written  and pronounced ). There is only one minimal pair to illustrate the contrast in distribution: , 'this' versus , 'X was done with Y', in which  only occurs in bound form.

Consonants
The consonant inventory of Arapaho is given in the table below.

Allophony
The phoneme  (the voiced bilabial stop) has a voiceless allophone [p] that occurs before other consonants or at the end of a word. In this same environment  is aspirated and devoiced. For example, the grammatical prefix  is pronounced , the grammatical prefix  is pronounced , and the word , 'I will turn out the lights' is }.

Syllable structures
In general, consonant clusters in Arapaho can only be two consonants long. At the "surface" (at the level of actual pronunciation), other clusters arise by phonological processes including vowel syncope, or by juxtaposition of morphemes.

Vowel-initial, onset-less syllables, however, can occur due to partitioning of vowel clusters. The vowel cluster is not always split into short vowel followed by long vowel; the location of the partition depends on Arapaho's complex pitch accent system. For example, another word with a sequence of three vowels, but with a different partitioning of vowels into syllables is  'bed'.

However, sometimes the vowel cluster does not divide and the whole cluster becomes the nucleus of the syllable.

Prosody
Arapaho is a pitch accent language. There are two phonemic tones: high (marked with an acute accent) or "normal" (unmarked). Although tonal contrasts are distinctive in Arapaho, minimal pairs such as those listed above are rare.

Morphology 
Arapaho is polysynthetic; verbs in particular take multiple morphemes.

Inflectional

Nouns

Animacy 
Nouns in Arapaho come in two classes: animate and inanimate. Which category a noun belongs to is part of the lexicon. Being animate does not necessitate "aliveness" (but aliveness does mean animate): doors, planets, ghosts, etc. are considered animate. Some nouns can also be both animate and inanimate, but in these situations, the animate version is more "active" (e.g. a log is inanimate, but a rolling log is animate).

Obviation 
Animate nouns can be made obviative or proximate.

When the underlying noun is consonant final, two general patterns can occur. These nouns reuse the plural marker to mark obviative singular and both obviative and proximate plural.

The other pattern occurs for most other consonant final noun stems and is summarized in the table below. C denotes the final consonant and the bracketed [C] denotes either consonant mutation of C or deletion of some number of stem-final phonemes.  is 'duck'.

For vowel-final stems, the general pattern is a variation of the first consonant final pattern. Namely, a single marker is used to mark all plural forms and the obviative singular form. For example, a stem meaning 'sheep, bighorn sheep,' becomes   in proximate singular but  in both plural forms and the obviative singular.

Verbs

Verb categorization 
Verbs are divided into classes depending on the transitivity and animacy of their argument(s). Transitivity of a verb affects how many arguments are affixed to the verb. Notice in the examples below the usage of the transitive form requires the addition of INAN, the inanimate marker for the object (the shoes). Verbal inflection also depends on "orders" like imperative.

Intransitive, Animate Subject (AI)

Transitive, Inanimate Object (TI)

Initial change 
Initial change (IC) can mark tense and aspect (in particular, "present tense and ongoing aspect or present perfect tense and aspect") under affirmative and conjunct orders. Differing phonological changes occur depending on the first vowel of the stem. If the vowel is short, it is lengthened. For example,  'to be red' becomes   'it is red'. Otherwise, an infix is placed before the first vowel. For example,  ('to walk downward') becomes  ('I am walking downward').

An irregular form of initial change affects some vowel-initial preverbs by appending an  before the first vowel, rather than the ordinary  that would be prepended to avoid a vowel-initial word. For example, the imperfective  morpheme becomes  instead of the expected  when prefixing verbs that would undergo initial change.

Agreement 
In sentences with an explicit noun phrase, separate from the verb, the verb agrees with the noun in terms of animacy, number, and whether the noun is proximate or obviative. The grammatical category, including person, of the noun also needs to agree with the verb. Note that the categories of subject and object do not affect agreement inflection. As an example of animacy agreement, the intransitive verb for 'to fall' has a form that takes an inanimate subject,  (PAST-on top-fall(II)-0S) and a form that takes an animate subject, .

If a verb has a single noun argument that is composed of two different types of noun, most speakers default to the obviative (over proximate) and inanimate (over animate) forms to refer to the composite noun argument in case of conflict. This can be seen in the example below where 'walk' takes an argument that is composed of a composite proximate and obviative noun. Both nouns are animate, but there is conflict regarding proximate or obviative. The verb thus defaults to the obviative plural (4PL).

Derivational

Nouns 
Arapaho has a number of derivational affixes and processes. Some operate on nouns to form verb-like clauses. For example, the morpheme  can prefix a noun to ask 'what kind of <noun>'.

Verbs 
Derivational morphology on verbs can be grouped into abstract and concrete. Abstract morphemes mark transitivity and the animacy of subject/object for the verb. For example, the basic root  'red' can be marked with abstract morphemes as follows

  'to be red', intransitive and takes an inanimate subject
  'to be red', intransitive and takes an animate subject

Concrete morphemes tend to add three types of meanings to the verb.

patients and undergoers; attach particularly common nouns after a verb with a transitive meaning to give it an object, resulting in an intransitive verb
 topics concerning nouns that lack volition; examples include body parts, weather and nature, sensations
 methods of achieving action; examples include tools, means of transportation, non-manmade forces such as wind

Reduplication 
Reduplication is prefixal and is formed by taking the first consonant (if there is one) and the first vowel and then adding , where the colon indicates that the preceding vowel is elongated. The  is deleted in the presence of a subsequent consonant. For example,  ('to walk past') after reduplication becomes  ('to walk back and forth past').

There are multiple usages of reduplication in Arapaho including pluralizing implied, secondary, and inanimate objects of (di)transitive verbs; indicating repeating and habitual action (extend the space and time a verb occurs in general), and intensifying. One example of marking repeating action is as follows 

There can be multiple reduplications in compound words, where each reduplication can have an independent effect. Some verbs appear to be only in a reduplicated form; these verbs tend to describe repeating, iterative action.

Syntax 
Arapaho has no canonical word order. Some sentences/clauses consist of only the verb like below.

Single noun phrase 
When a sentence contains a verb and a single noun phrase, the noun phrase can either precede or follow the verb. Preposing the noun phrase, however, gives it more importance and salience. Some instances where noun phrases are preposed include introducing a new referent (or reintroducing one that was inactive) and creating contrast.

V-NP order

NP-V order (additional context: a new referent, "stone monuments," is being introduced)

Two noun phrases 
For a basic sentence with a single verb that takes two noun phrases as arguments, all orderings are possible, but having the verb final is less common.

Noun phrase hierarchy 
A hierarchy exists in determining which noun phrase goes in which position. In the listing below, the first in the pair is treated as "higher" in the hierarchy and tends therefore to be the leftmost NP.

subject (object)
proximate (obviative)
actor (undergoer)
marked object (unmarked object)
 animate (inanimate)

Subject-verb-object order

Verb-subject-(implied) object order

Saliency 
Saliency determines whether a noun phrase can precede its corresponding verb. Noun phrases are deemed salient if they are referring to something new, something that is being reintroduced, something contrastive, or something that is being emphasized.

Preposed NP (here, the noun phrase meaning 'where the attack was taking place' precedes the verb 'see' to create emphasis)

Both NPs preceding Verb (uncommon) (additional context: occurs under "contrastive focus")

Syntax of noun/verb phrases

Modifying nouns 
Generally, noun modifiers occur before the noun. These modifiers additionally tend to occur in a particular order relative each other. For example, in the example below, note that the presentative 'here is' occurs before the demonstrative 'this'

Particles and verb stems 
Some particles are more closely linked to verbs; these particles generally precede the verb and are often neighboring the corresponding verb.

Particle expressing potential

Particle expressing recent past

Adverbials 
Adverbials are a type of particle. Unlike other particles in Arapaho, however, they are not a closed class and are instead derived from or composed of other morphemes. One purpose of adverbial construction is to emphasize a morpheme by extracting it from a verb and having it stand alone. Another purpose is to convey meaning outside of what can normally be attached to a verb.

Adverbials are constructed by appending  (which can become  after vowel harmony) to the end of the root.

A common usage of adverbials is to modify verbs. Adverbials can also act like prepositions and modify noun phrases; such adverbials can occur before or after the noun phrase and are thus exceptions to the rule that nominal modifiers prepose the noun (see example below).

Notes
AI:intransitive verb, animate subject
TA:transitive verb, animate subject
TI:transitive verb, inanimate subject
II:intransitive verb, inanimate subject
IMPERS:impersonal
PART:participle
POTENT:potential mood
4PL:4th person obviative, plural
PART:participle
IMPERS:impersonal
IC:initial change

References

Salzmann, Zdeněk and The Northern Arapaho Tribe and Anderson, Jeffrey. 1998.

Further reading
Goddard, Ives. 1998. "Recovering Arapaho etymologies by reconstructing forwards". In Melchert, Craig & Jasanoff, Jay H. (eds.) Mír Curad: Studies in Honor of Calvert Watkins, Innsbruck: Institut für Sprachwissenschaftder Universität Innsbruck, Innsbrucker Beiträge zur Sprachwissenschaft, pp. 183–200.
Jacques, Guillaume 2013. "The sound change s>n in Arapaho", Folia Linguistica Historica 34:43-57
Pentland, David. 1997. [review of] Principles and Methods in Historical Phonology: From Proto-Algonkian to Arapaho, by Marc Picard, 1994. Diachronica 14.2: 383–386.
Pentland, David. 1998. "Initial *s > n in Arapaho-Atsina". Diachronica 15.2:309–321.
Picard, Marc. 1994.  Principles and Methods in Historical Phonology: From Proto-Algonkian to Arapaho.  Montreal and Kingston: McGill—Queen's University Press.
Mithun, Marianne. 1999. The Languages of Native North America. Cambridge: Cambridge University Press.

External links

The Arapaho Language (U. of Colo. Arapaho Project)
Arapaho Language Archives (U. of Colo. Arapaho Project), with many dialogues and narratives in Arapaho with glosses
Nun-na-a-in-ah Ve-vith-ha Hin-nen-nau Hin-nen-it-dah-need (1895) Portions of the Book of Common Prayer in Arapaho
OLAC resources in and about the Arapaho language
Let's Learn Arapaho
Constantine Scollen
Arapaho Text Corpus
Dictionary of the Arapaho Language , 2012, 4th Edition, by Andrew Cowell, Alonzo Moss Sr., William and Wayne C'Hair, Arapahoe Immersion School, and the elders of the Northern Arapaho Tribe, Ethete, Wyoming
 Arapaho DoReCo corpus compiled by Andrew Cowell. Audio recordings of narrative texts with transcriptions time-aligned at the phone level, translations, and time-aligned morphological annotations.

Arapaho
Plains Algonquian languages
Indigenous languages of the North American Plains
Endangered Algic languages
Indigenous languages of Oklahoma
Endangered indigenous languages of the Americas